T3 was a sea-going torpedo boat that was operated by the Royal Yugoslav Navy between 1921 and 1941. She saw active service during World War I, performing convoy, escort and minesweeping tasks, anti-submarine operations and shore bombardment missions. Following Austria-Hungary's defeat in 1918, she was allocated to the Navy of the Kingdom of Serbs, Croats and Slovenes, which subsequently became the Royal Yugoslav Navy, and was renamed T3. At the time, she and the seven other 250t-class boats were the only modern sea-going vessels of the fledgling maritime force.

During the interwar period, T7 and the rest of the navy were involved in training exercises and cruises to friendly ports, but activity was limited by reduced naval budgets. The ship was captured by the Italians during the Axis invasion of Yugoslavia in April 1941. After her main armament was modernised, she served with the Royal Italian Navy under her Yugoslav designation, although she was only used for coastal and second-line tasks. Following the Italian capitulation in September 1943, she was captured by Germany and, after being fitted with additional anti-aircraft guns, served with the German Navy or the Navy of the Independent State of Croatia as TA48. In German/Croatian service her crew of 52 consisted entirely of Croatian officers and enlisted men. She was sunk by Allied aircraft in February 1945 while in the port of Trieste, where she had been built.

Background
In 1910, the Austro-Hungarian Naval Technical Committee initiated the design and development of a  coastal torpedo boat, specifying that it should be capable of sustaining  for 10 hours. This specification was based on expectations that the Strait of Otranto, where the Adriatic Sea meets the Ionian Sea, would be blockaded by hostile forces during a future conflict. In such circumstances, there would be a need for a torpedo boat that could sail from the Austro-Hungarian Navy base at the Cattaro (now Kotor) to the Strait during darkness, locate and attack blockading ships and return to port before morning. Steam turbine power was selected for propulsion, as diesels with the necessary power were not available, and the Austro-Hungarian Navy did not have the practical experience to run turbo-electric boats. Stabilimento Tecnico Triestino (STT) of Trieste was selected for the contract to build eight vessels, ahead of one other tenderer. The T-group designation signified that they were built at Trieste.

Description and construction
The crew consisted of 39 officers and enlisted men. The boats were powered by two Parsons steam turbines driving two propellers, using steam generated by two Yarrow water-tube boilers, one of which burned fuel oil and the other coal. The T-group had one funnel rather than the two funnels of the later groups of the class. Due to inadequate funding, 78 T and the rest of the 250t class were essentially coastal vessels, despite the original intention that they would be used for "high seas" operations. They were the first small Austro-Hungarian Navy boats to use turbines, and this contributed to ongoing problems with them.

The boats were originally to be armed with three Škoda  L/30 guns, and three  torpedo tubes, but this was changed to two guns and four torpedo tubes before the first boat was completed, to standardise the armament with the F-group to follow. They could also carry 10–12 naval mines. The fifth of its class to be built, 78 T was laid down on 22 October 1913, launched on 4 March 1914, and completed on 23 August 1914. Later that year, one  machine gun was added.

Career

World War I
During World War I, 78 T was used for convoy, escort, minesweeping tasks, anti-submarine operations and shore bombardment missions. She also conducted patrols and supported seaplane raids against the Italian Adriatic coast. On 24 May 1915, 78 T and seven other 250t-class boats were involved in the shelling of various Italian shore-based targets known as the Bombardment of Ancona, with 78 T involved in the shelling of Porto Corsini near Ravenna. In the latter action, an Italian  shore battery returned fire, hitting the scout cruiser  and damaging one of the other 250t-class boats. On 23 July, 78 T and another 250t-class boat participated in a shore bombardment and landing operation led by Novaras sister ship  against San Benedetto del Tronto, Ortona and Termoli on the central Adriatic coast of Italy. In late November 1915, the Austro-Hungarian fleet deployed a force from its main fleet base at Pola to Cattaro in the southern Adriatic; this force included six of the eight T-group torpedo boats, so it is possible that one of these was 78 T. This force was tasked to maintain a permanent patrol of the Albanian coastline and interdict any troop transports crossing from Italy.

In 1917, one of her 66 mm guns was placed on an anti-aircraft mount. On 11 May 1917, the British submarine  stalked 78 T off Pola, firing two torpedoes at her. The British captain had kept his submarine's periscope extended too far and for too long, and the tell-tale "feather" had alerted the crew of 78 T, allowing her crew to avoid the incoming torpedoes. On 23 September, 77 T and 78 T were laying a minefield off Grado in the northern Adriatic when they had a brief encounter with an Italian MAS boat. On 28 November, a number of 250t-class boats were involved in two shore bombardment missions. In the second mission, 78 T joined seven other 250t-class boats and six destroyers for the bombardment of Porto Corsini, Marotta and Cesenatico. By 1918, the Allies had strengthened their ongoing blockade on the Strait of Otranto, as foreseen by the Austro-Hungarian Navy. As a result, it was becoming more difficult for the German and Austro-Hungarian U-boats to get through the strait and into the Mediterranean Sea. In response to these blockades, the new commander of the Austro-Hungarian Navy, Konteradmiral Miklós Horthy, decided to launch an attack on the Allied defenders with battleships, scout cruisers, and destroyers.

About 03:15 on 10 June, while returning from an uneventful patrol off the Dalmatian coast, two Royal Italian Navy MAS boats, MAS 15 and MAS 21, spotted the smoke from the Austrian ships. Both boats successfully penetrated the escort screen and split to engage the dreadnoughts individually. MAS 21 attacked Tegetthoff, but her torpedoes missed. Under the command of Luigi Rizzo, MAS 15 fired two torpedoes at 03:25, both of which hit Szent István. Both boats evaded pursuit. The torpedo hits on Szent István were abreast her boiler rooms, which flooded, knocking out power to the pumps. Szent István capsized less than three hours after being torpedoed.

Inter-war years
78 T survived the war intact. In 1920, under the terms of the previous year's Treaty of Saint-Germain-en-Laye by which rump Austria officially ended World War I, she was allocated to the Kingdom of Serbs, Croats and Slovenes (KSCS, later Yugoslavia). Along with three other 250t-class, T-group boats, 76 T, 77 T and 79 T, and four F-group boats she served with the KSCS Navy (later the Royal Yugoslav Navy, KJRM; Краљевска Југословенска Ратна Морнарица). Transferred in March 1921, in KJRM service, 78 T was renamed T3. At the time of her transfer, she and the other 250t-class torpedo boats were the only modern sea-going warships in the Yugoslav fleet. In 1925, exercises were conducted off the Dalmatian coast, involving the majority of the navy. It is not clear if T5 was one of the torpedo boats involved. The ships and crews made a very good impression while visiting Malta. In 1932, the British naval attaché was reporting that Yugoslav ships were engaging in few exercises or manoeuvres due to reduced budgets.

World War II
In April 1941, Yugoslavia entered World War II when it was invaded by the German-led Axis powers. At the time of the invasion, T3 was assigned to the Southern Sector of the KJRM's Coastal Defence Command based at the Bay of Kotor, along with her sister ship T1, several minesweepers and other craft. Just prior to the invasion, T3, along with the bulk of the 3rd Torpedo Division, was detached to Sibenik, in accordance with plans to attack the Italian enclave of Zara. When the invasion began on 6 April, T3 was anchored in the Sibenik channel between Jadrija and Zablace with three other torpedo boats, but she was not equipped with modern anti-aircraft guns, and so was unable to effectively engage the Italian aircraft flying over Zlarin to attack Sibenik. The torpedo boats were ordered to retreat to Zaton, but T3 was hampered by problems with one of her boilers and was sent to Primosten. He plan to attack Zara was abandoned after messages were received about the proclamation of the Independent State of Croatia on 10 April and that Yugoslav forces were retreating on all fronts. T3 was captured in port by the Royal Italian Navy and was operated by them under her Yugoslav designation. She was fitted with two  L/30 anti-aircraft guns in place of her 66 mm guns, but no other significant alterations were made to her. Due to her obsolescence, the Italians only used T3 for coastal and second-line duties.

When the Italians capitulated in September 1943, the German Navy seized T3 in the port of Rijeka and renamed her TA48. She was commissioned on 15 August 1944, and was used for patrol and escort work in the northern Adriatic. The Germans added to her armament, fitting her with two single  anti-aircraft guns in addition to the guns fitted by the Italians, and removing two of her torpedo tubes. She was either crewed exclusively by Croat officers and sailors but remained under German control, or was transferred to the Navy of the Independent State of Croatia but then repossessed by the Germans on 14 December 1944 due to the unreliable nature of the Croatian personnel. Her complement was also increased to 52 during her German/Croatian service. She was active in the northern Adriatic but saw little action. She was sunk in the port of Trieste by Allied aircraft on 20 February 1945.

Notes

Footnotes

References

 
 
 
 
 
 
 
 
 
 
 
 
 
 
 
 
 
 
 
 
 

1914 ships
Torpedo boats of the Austro-Hungarian Navy
World War I torpedo boats of Austria-Hungary
Torpedo boats of the Royal Yugoslav Navy
World War II naval ships of Yugoslavia
Naval ships of Yugoslavia captured by Italy during World War II
Naval ships of Italy captured by Germany during World War II
Ships built in Trieste
Torpedo boats sunk by aircraft
Shipwrecks in the Adriatic Sea
Maritime incidents in February 1945